Nigel Bathurst Hankin (1920-2007) was brought up by his grandmother in Bexhill, Sussex. He was sent to Burma during late World War II but the war ended around the time he reached Bombay, India (now Mumbai, India). He liked the bustle of the Indian Subcontinent (Delhi, India in particular) and consequently he lived there for the rest of his life.

One of his early formative experiences was watching the crowds at the funeral for Mohandas Karamchand Gandhi while he still wore the uniform of the newly defunct British Raj just after the formal Partition of India. His subsequent eclectic activities in India included running a mobile cinema. Later he worked for the British High Commission and during his tenure there he helped newcomers to India interpret the local mores and lingo. In 1992 he formally compiled his know-how into the book ""Hanklyn-Janklin"" which became well known to locals and foreigners to the Subcontinent alike.  This cross cultural dictionary is what he is most well known for and many critics compare it to the 19th Century book Hobson-Jobson.

Hankin never married, had no children and kept English traits such as eating an "English Breakfast" that included cornflakes. He also gave tours of Delhi which were highly sought after but hard to book. They featured sights such as hidden bazaars and Hankin's walk and talk through Coronation Park. His brother and other relatives occasionally visited him in India before his death at age 87.

References 

1920 births
2007 deaths
English lexicographers
Businesspeople from Delhi
Cinema pioneers
Tour guides
20th-century lexicographers
British emigrants to India